Birbal Dhar was a leader in the Kashmiri resistance to Afghan rule in the early 19th century. He led a deputation which persuaded Sikh ruler Maharaja Ranjit Singh to invade Kashmir in 1819, which effectively ended Afghan and Muslim rule in Kashmir.

Due to his role in the ending of the Afghan rule, Birbal Dhar was awarded with the role of Taluqdar, rough translation - Nawab, for the province of Kashmir under the rule of Maharaja Ranjit Singh.

He was offered a seat on the council of the Maharaja, but refused in order to be able to be close to his people in Kashmir.

Ever since the time of Mughals and Afghans, the Taluqdar was the highest administrative service for a state.

He was an avid follower of a previous Taluqdar of Kashmir, Ali Mardan Khan, and so was a tradition for him and his descendants to keep up the Chashme Shahi Garden where apparently the Kurdish General had found God.

References

History of Kashmir
Kashmiri people